Gopnik is a surname. Notable people with the surname include:
Myrna Gopnik (born 1935), Canadian linguist 
Adam Gopnik (born 1956), American writer, son of Myrna
Alison Gopnik (born 1955), psychology professor, daughter of Myrna
Blake Gopnik (born 1963), American art critic, son of Myrna

See also